Shilong Road is a station on Shanghai Metro Line 3.

Gallery

References

Shanghai Metro stations in Xuhui District
Line 3, Shanghai Metro
Railway stations in China opened in 2000
Railway stations in Shanghai